Bolshoy is a rural locality (a khutor) and the administrative center of Bolshovskoye Rural Settlement, Serafimovichsky District, Volgograd Oblast, Russia. The population was 1,322 as of 2010. There are 30 streets.

Geography 
Bolshoy is located on the Tsutskan River, 49 km southwest of Serafimovich (the district's administrative centre) by road. Zatonsky is the nearest rural locality.

References 

Rural localities in Serafimovichsky District